The Dorze are ethnic group and small community inhabited Gamo Highlands in southern Ethiopia. They speak Gamo language, a dialect of Afroasiatic language.

Population 
According to Ethnologue, the Dorze numbered 29,000 individuals (1994 census), of whom 9,910 were monolingual.

They primarily live in the southern parts of the country, though some have migrated to Addis Ababa and other regions. Many reside in villages near the cities of Chencha and Arba Minch.

Language 
They speak the Dorze language, an Omotic tongue.

Culture 

Weaving is a primary profession for a number of Dorze. Traditional Dorze textiles are colourful.

They are known for their traditional weaving of huts made out of local bamboo. The huts can last up to 80 years.

Their polyphonic multi-part vocal music features a sophisticated use of hocket.

Religion 
Dorze people originally adhered to traditional African religions. Most are members to the faith of the Ethiopian Orthodox Tewahedo Church.

History 

Communities of Dorze people live on the peripheries of Addis Ababa, mostly in the Burayu and Sebeta areas. A group of Dorze people had a conflict with some Oromo people. This issue got an immediate attention among the Qeerroo who are active in Ethiopian politics in recent years. The incident occurred as the Qeerroo were organizing themselves for the reception of the Oromo Liberation Front leaders, on the 14 and 15 September—following political reform by prime minister Abiy Ahmed. This little conflict between the Dorze and Oromo people grew to a full-blown attack on the whole population of Dorze as the Qeerroo returned from the reception. The result was a universal massacring: killing the men and children with machetes, a ruthless raping of the women in front of their husbands and children, targeting specifically  Dorze (and some Gurage) people living around Addis Ababa, on the 16 and 17 September 2018. Independent media sources called the killing a case of ethnic cleansing. In the Burayu area alone, the  media has reported that 23 people have been killed, more than 500 have been injured and over 15000 people have been displaced. Other sources citing data from the police have confirmed that more 60 people have been killed

The government media claims that the attack has been stopped by the security forces. But, some people claim that the attack is still going on in a more systematic manner to completely remove the Dorze people out of the Oromo land. The killing triggered massive public protest in Addis Ababa.

References

External links 

Ethnic groups in Ethiopia
Omotic-speaking peoples